The Oklahoma State Department of Education is the state education agency of the State of Oklahoma charged with determining the policies and directing the administration and supervision of the public school system of Oklahoma. The State Board of Education, the governing body of the Department, is composed of the Oklahoma State Superintendent of Public Instruction and six members appointed by the Governor of Oklahoma with the approval of the Oklahoma Senate. The State Superintendent, in addition to serving as chair of the Board, serves as the chief executive officer of the Department and is elected by the voters of Oklahoma every four years.

The current State Superintendent of Public Instruction is Joy Hofmeister who was elected in 2014, defeating incumbent Janet Barresi.

The State Board of Education, and thus the State Department of Education, was created in its current configuration in 1971 during the term of Governor David Hall. The agency maintains its headquarters in the Oliver Hodge Building at 2500 North Lincoln Boulevard in Oklahoma City.

Together with the Oklahoma Department of Career and Technology Education and the Oklahoma State Regents for Higher Education, the Department forms the core of Oklahoma's public education system.

Leadership

The Department is led by the Secretary of Education and the State Superintendent of Public Instruction (who is the Chair of the State Board of Education). Under Governor Kevin Stitt, the Education Secretary is Ryan Walters and Joy Hofmeister serves as State Superintendent.

Board of Education
At the ratification of the Oklahoma Constitution in 1907, the State Superintendent, the Governor of Oklahoma, the Secretary of State of Oklahoma, and the Attorney General of Oklahoma served as the State Board of Education. With the passage of the Oklahoma School Code of 1971, the Board consisted of seven members: the State Superintendent (who serves as Chair, and is a statewide elected official) and six members appointed by the Governor by and with the advice and consent of the Oklahoma Senate. In order to be eligible to serve on the Board, members must possess a high school diploma or certificate of high school equivalency. The members appointed by the Governor serve staggered six year terms so that one member's term expires every year.

All appointments take effect on April 2 of the year of appointment. Excluding the State Superintendent, there must be at least one member representing each congressional district of the State. Any remaining members are appointed from the state at large, provided that only one member may represent any given county, city or town. In the event of vacancy, the Governor appoints a new member, subject to confirmation by the Senate at the next session of the Legislature, to serve the remainder of the unexpired term.

Members of the Board serve without compensation but are reimbursed for travel expenses.

Current board membership
As of Jan 2021, the current board members are:

•   Joy Hofmeister,
Chair of the Board

•   Brian Bobek of Oklahoma City; represents Congressional District 4

•   William E. “Bill” Flanagan of Claremore; represents Congressional District 2

•   Congressional District 3 is currently vacant

•   Carlisha Williams Bradley of Tulsa; represents Congressional District 1

•   Jennifer Monies of Oklahoma City; represents Congressional District 5

•   Estela Hernandez of Oklahoma City; at-large,

Duties of State Board of Education
It is the primary responsibility of the State Board of Education to perform all duties necessary to the administration of the public school system in Oklahoma as specified in the Oklahoma School Code of 1971.

Administration
The Board is responsible for establishing and prescribing the duties of the State Superintendent of Public Instruction, who is the chief executive officer of the State Department of Education and the Oklahoma public school system. Such duties include the responsibility to give advice and make recommendations to the Board on all matters pertaining to the policies and administration of the State Department of Education and the Oklahoma public school system. The State Superintendent is thus responsible for administering and enforcing the adopted policies and rules established by the Board.

The Board organizes and has control over the administrative and supervisory agencies, divisions, and personnel of the State Department of Education. A such, it is the Board's responsibility to submit to the Governor a departmental budget based upon major functions of the State Department of Education based on the needs of local school districts. Appropriation requested by the Board must include State Aid to local schools as well as funds for free textbooks, school lunches, and Indian education. The funds appropriated by the Oklahoma Legislature to be used by the Board as determined by the Board. However, all funds must be consolidate into two items: administration and aid to schools.

On the December 1 of each year, the Board must prepare and deliver to the Governor and the Legislature an annual report for preceding year. The annual report must contain detailed statistics and other information concerning enrollment, attendance, expenditures (including State Aid), and other pertinent data for all public schools in the State. Also, reports from each and every division, department, institution or other agency under the supervision of the Board are included in the annual report. In such annual report, the Board may make such recommendations for the improvement of the public school system of the state as the Board deems necessary. Each annual report must also include a statement of the receipts and expenditures of the Board for the past year, and a statement of plans and recommendations for the management and improvement of public schools of the state.

Curriculum
It is the responsibility of the Board to formulate and adopt the curriculum, courses of study and other instructional aids necessary for the adequate instruction of Oklahoma' students in the public schools of the state. The Board has the authority to the license and certify the instructional, supervisory and administrative personnel of the public schools of the state. Also, the Board has the authority to issue the rules governing the classification, inspection, supervision and accrediting of all public nursery, kindergarten, elementary and secondary schools and on-site educational services provided by public school districts or state-accredited private schools. However, no school may be denied accreditation by the Board-based solely on the basis of average daily attendance.

Oversight
When deemed necessary by the Board, the Board can require any person having administrative control of any school districts in Oklahoma to make regular or special reports regarding the activities of the schools in their districts. In requiring such reports, the Board has the authority to withhold any or all state funds under its control, to withhold official recognition, including accrediting, until such required reports have been filed and accepted by the Board. The Board may revoke the certificates of any person failing or refusing to make reports to the Board.

It is the duty and responsibility of the Board to provide for the health and safety of school children and school personnel while under the jurisdiction of school authorities. This includes:
providing for a uniform system of pupil and personnel accounting, records and report
the supervision of the transportation of students
upon request of the local school board, to act on behalf of the public schools of the state in the purchase of transportation equipment

When local school boards proposed structure changes to their school buildings, the Board has the authority to review the preliminary plans for new construction and major alterations.

Relationship with Corrections Department
While the Department establishes rules for the classification, inspection and accreditation of public schools under the jurisdiction of the Oklahoma Department of Corrections, the Department must recognize that the Director of the Oklahoma Department of Corrections is the administrative authority for those schools for the appointment of the principals and teachers of those schools.

Organization
State Board of Education
Superintendent of Public Instruction
Administrative Services Division - led by State Superintendent, immediate support staff of State Superintendent, provides support for the services of the various divisions of the state education agency and support of the State Board of Education
Accreditation and Standards Division - led by Assistant State Superintendent, oversees school accreditation standards while supporting deregulation of schools
Professional Services Division - led by Assistant State Superintendent, coordinates the certification and continuing education of Oklahoma's professional educators. Specific services are provided to local school board members and the public school districts in meeting federal civil rights laws and state laws and regulations concerning professional development
Financial Services Division - led by Assistant State Superintendent, primary disbursing and auditing for the annual distribution of state funds to local school districts. Also the central data collection point for information concerning student attendance, valuations, budgets, student transfers, and other data having a direct impact on allocation of state-appropriated funds
Special Education Services Division - led by Assistant Superintendent, ensures children with disabilities receive appropriate services and that technical assistance is provided to parents, local schools, and other state and federal agencies
School Improvement Division - led by three Assistant Superintendents, supports School Improvement help school use data from the Oklahoma School Testing Program to improve instruction in the state-mandated core curriculum (PASS) through workshops and technical assistance on grant and program management, curriculum development and implementation, innovation and support programs, and instruction, remediation and assessment
Office of Innovation, Support, and Alternative Education
Office of Accountability and Assessment
Office of Standards and Curriculum
Fiscal Services Division - directs primarily federally funded programs and serve specialized needs of local school districts
Legal Services Division - provides legal services and advice to the Department

Staffing and budget
The Education Department, with an annual budget of over $3 billion, is one of the larger employers of the State. For fiscal year 2014, the Department was authorized 333 full-time employees.

In 2016, teachers' salaries in the state ranked 49th among the fifty states.

Registered historic sites
More than 15 schools designed or built by the Oklahoma State Department of Education and its predecessors, including the Oklahoma State Dept. of Instruction, have been designated as historic sites.  Many have been listed on the U.S. National Register of Historic Places.

The projects listed on the National Register include:
Ash Creek School, off Ash Creek Rd., Wilburton, OK, (Okla. State Dept. of Education), NRHP-listed
Bowers School, off US 270 on county road, Wilburton, OK, (Oklahoma State Dept. of Education), NRHP-listed
Cambria School, NE of Hartshorne, Hartshorne, OK, (Oklahoma State Dept. of Education), NRHP-listed
Cole Chapel School, N of Hartshorne, Hartshorne, OK, (Oklahoma State Dept. of Education), NRHP-listed
Dayton School, SE of Lamont, Lamont, OK, (Oklahoma State Dept. of Instruction), NRHP-listed
Degnan School, NW of Wilburton off OK 2, Wilburton, OK, (Okla. State Dept. of Education), NRHP-listed
Fewell School, off OK 144, Nashoba, OK, (Oklahoma State Dept. of Education), NRHP-listed
Kinta High School, OK 2, Kinta, OK, (Okla. State Dept. of Education), NRHP-listed
New State School, S of Hartshorne near North Fork Elm Creek, Hartshorne, OK, (Oklahoma State Dept. of Education), NRHP-listed
Roberta School Campus, off OK E70, Durant, OK, (Okla. Dept. of Education), NRHP-listed
Shady Point School, NE edge of the community, Shady Point, OK, (Okla. State Dept. of Education), NRHP-listed
Snow School, US 271, Snow, OK, (Okla. State Dept. of Education), NRHP-listed
Speer School, off US 271 E on a county road, Hugo, OK, (Okla. State Dept. of Education), NRHP-listed
Spencerville School Campus, S of Spencerville, Spencerville, OK, (Okla. State Dept. of Education), NRHP-listed
Summerfield School, off US 271, Summerfield, OK, (Okla. State Dept. of Education), NRHP-listed
Tipton Ridge School, N of Blocker, Blocker, OK, (Oklahoma State Dept. of Education), NRHP-listed
Tucker School, off US 59, Spiro, OK, (Okla. State Dept. of Education), NRHP-listed
Williams School, NW of Cameron, Cameron, OK, (Okla. State Dept. of Education), NRHP-listed

Encyclo-Media
Encyclo-Media is a two-day educational conference hosted by the Oklahoma State Department of Education, focusing on the fields of library media, reading, counselling, gifted and talented, and technology.  The annual conference, usually held in mid-September, hosts approximately 2800 educators.  Over 100 breakout programs, 250 exhibitors, 4 luncheons, national speakers, and state educators sharing their best practices are highlighted each year.  National and state authors appear as speakers and to autograph their books. Notable past speakers include Jim Trelease, Richard Peck, Patricia Polacco, Stephen Krashen, Sharon Draper and Linda Sue Park.

Sponsoring organizations
These four professional organizations help sponsor Encyclo-Media.  Annually these groups host luncheons during the conference.
Oklahoma Association of School Library Media Specialists (OASLMS)
Oklahoma Technology Association, Inc. (OTA)
Oklahoma School Counselor Association (OSCA)
Oklahoma Association for Gifted, Creative, And Talented, Inc. (OAGCT)

For 2009, the 21st Century Community Learning Centers (21st CCLC) hosted a luncheon during the conference.  This group is affiliated with the Oklahoma Afterschool Network (OKAN).

History
Encyclo-Media began in 1981 as a statewide workshop, featuring library media programs.  The first Encyclo-Media was held at the University of Central Oklahoma in Edmond, Oklahoma on September 10 & 11, 1981.  There was a special breakout program held for recipients of the Library Media Improvement Grant.

In the late 1970s the Library Media Improvement Program was established by the Oklahoma state legislature, the Oklahoma State Board of Education, and the Oklahoma State Department of Education (OSDE).  Money was appropriated and Library Media Improvement (LMI) Grants were awarded to help upgrade the collection and staffing of school libraries to meet state and national guidelines.  LMI Grants were awarded from 1978 through 1994, beginning with the 1977-78 school year.

Encyclo-Media started as a result of the LMI Grants. In 1980 a workshop was held for grant schools.  Barbara Spriestersbach, Assistant Administrator at the OSDE, extended the program to everyone after widespread interest, not just grant schools.  The following year, Encyclo-Media was officially organized and as a result Spriestersbach was awarded the American Association of School Librarians Baker & Taylor Distinguished Service Award in 1991 for her leadership in the implementation of the LMI program. Since the first Encyclo-Media directors of the Library Media/Instructional Television Section have organized and directed the conference.

See also
Oklahoma State Superintendent of Public Instruction
Public education
Public education in the United States
Board of education
Oklahoma Department of Career and Technology Education
Oklahoma Educational Television Authority

References

External links
Oklahoma State Department of Education official website

Encyclo-Media official website

Education, State Board of
Education, State Board of
Education, State Board of
State departments of education of the United States
Government agencies established in 1971
1971 establishments in Oklahoma